Parkman may refer to:

 People
 Francis Parkman (1823–1893)
 His uncle George Parkman (1790–1849), the victim in the Parkman-Webster murder case

 Places in the United States
 Parkman, Maine
 Parkman, Ohio
 Parkman, Wyoming

 Fictional characters and locations
 Officer Matt Parkman, portrayed by Greg Grunberg on the NBC television series Heroes 
 Maury Parkman, Matt's father, portrayed by Alan Blumenfeld
 Parkman, Indiana, town in the novel Some Came Running

See also
Pac-Man